Kuggeleijn is a surname. Notable people with the surname include:
 Chris Kuggeleijn (born 1956), New Zealand cricketer
 Scott Kuggeleijn (born 1992), New Zealand cricketer and son of Chris